Erick Ginard (born September 8, 1979) is a contemporary visual artist and the most internationally awarded Cuban poster artist since the Cuban poster boom of the 1970s.

Early life 
The first son of a marriage of doctors, Erick Ginard was born in the municipality of Marianao in Havana, Cuba. His first years were spent in Havana, but some time later the family settled in the eastern city of Las Tunas where Ginard's parents were appointed by the Cuban government to carry out a social mission. Ginard grew up between the two Cuban cities. Although from a young age he seemed to have an aptitude for drawing, Erick preferred sports and outdoor activities rather than artistic ones.

At the age of 18, back in Havana and after having completed his compulsory military service, he began his studies at the Higher Institute of Industrial Design (ISDi) without having a very precise idea of what design meant. In his own words, during his college years he was the worst student he could be. He was just sure that he didn't want to become a doctor.

Learning as he went along, Ginard designed and illustrated his first books for some Cuban publishing houses. Simultaneously, he began to be interested in the poster art.

Career 

After graduating in 2003, Ginard did practically everything in Cuba in the field of graphic design. In the next five years he designed and illustrated more than a hundred books and magazines for various Cuban, Mexican and American publishers. He designed publications such as Caminos magazine, the cultural magazine La Letra del Escriba, the Journal of the International Festival of New Latin American Cinema and the newspaper of the Havana International Book Fair while creating his first posters.

With a strong expressionist aesthetic, Ginard's posters quickly stand out in the Cuban poster landscape with an identity of their own. The unfinished hand drawing, like a sketch, and the risky use of typography marked his early works and are often found throughout his later graphic production always categorized as an endearing rarity.

In 2008, his poster to celebrate the ten years of "A Guitarra Limpia" at the Pablo de la Torriente Brau Cultural Center won the First Prize in the national contest organized for this purpose.

In 2010, Ginard settled in Mexico City where he founded his own design studio together with Cuban artist Katherine R. Paz. Tojosa Design Studio becomes the physical and spiritual space where Ginard continuously develops signature projects. At the same time, he begins to represent Cuba and Mexico in biennials, contests, and poster events around the world, becoming one of the most recognized poster artists worldwide.

Erick Ginard's graphic work has been exhibited in more than 40 countries. Ginard's posters are part of the permanent collections of various museums and iconic cultural institutions such as the Toyama Prefectural Museum of Art and Design in Japan and the Lahti Poster Museum in Finland.

In 2020, Ginard was the only representative from the Americas in the professional design jury of the Golden Turtle Festival in Moscow.

Selected awards and honors 

 Grand Prix - "7th Prague Virtual Biennale", Czech Republic.
 Gold Award - "The Golden Turtle Festival '17", Russia.
Gold Medal - "Bolivia Poster Biennial BICeBé '21", Bolivia.
 Silver Award - "3rd Taipei International Design Award", Taiwan.
 Silver Medal - "15th International Poster Biennial in Mexico (BICM)", Mexico.
 Silver Award - "The 3rd Exhibition of Contemporary International Ink Design", China.
 Bronze Medal - "16th International Poster Biennial in Mexico (BICM)", Mexico.
 Judges' Special Award - "3rd Taipei International Design Award", Taiwan.
 Poster Prize - "62nd San Sebastian International Film Festival", Spain.
 Honorable Mention - "7th International Biennale of Theatre Poster Rzeszów", Poland.
 Diploma of the Jury - "The 6th Moscow Poster Competition", Russia.
 Jury Special Prize - "International Poster Design Competition Against Violence Toward Women", Turkey.
 Winner Poster - "Poster for Tomorrow", France.
Winner Poster - "V Anfachen Award", Germany.
 Winner Poster - "II Anfachen Award", Germany.
 Winner Poster - "1st Calanca Biennale", Switzerland.
 Winner Poster - "TYPODAY International Poster Competition", India.
 Excellence Award - "The 10th China International Poster Biennial", China.
Award of Excellence - "17th Platinum Originality Award - China Academy of Art", China.
Distinction - "10th Taiwan International Graphic Design Award", Taiwan.
Distinction - "9th Taiwan International Graphic Design Award", Taiwan.
 Honorable Mention Award - "2nd We Want Jazz International Poster Competition", Poland.
 Honorable Distinction Award - "Stop Hate Poster Show", Poland.
 Honorary Distinction - "5th Museum of Typography International Poster Contest", Greece.
Honorary Distinction - "3rd Museum of Typography International Poster Contest", Greece.
 Honoured Artist - "13th Art Moves Billboard Art Festival", Poland.
Honoured Artist - "11th Art Moves Billboard Art Festival", Poland.
2nd Prize - "Picasso's Guernica 80 Years Poster Competition", Cuba.
 1st Prize - "19th International Book Fair Poster Competition", Cuba.
 1st Prize - "UNESCO Program Visual Identity Award", Cuba.
 1st Prize - "1st A Guitarra Limpia Poster Award", Cuba.

References

External links 
 

Cuban artists
Cuban designers
Cuban graphic designers
Cuban illustrators
1979 births
Cuban poster artists
Cuban contemporary artists
Living people
Artists from Havana